is a Japanese anime television series created by Tatsuo Yoshida and directed by Ippei Kuri. The series aired on Fuji TV from April 2, 1969, to September 24, 1969, totaling 26 episodes. Two manga adaptations were created, the first published in Shogakukan's Weekly Shōnen Sunday from July 28 to November 17, 1968, and a 4-chapters series in Shueisha's Weekly Shōnen Jump from May 22 to July 10, 1969.

The series stars a teenage martial artist named Sanshiro (voiced by Ikuo Nishikawa), trained in the Kurenai School of Jiujitsu and centers around his search for his fathers killer. Accompanying Sanshiro is an orphaned boy named Kenbo (voiced by Kenbo Kaminarimon) and his pet dog Boke (voiced by Hiroshi Otake). Sanshiros only clue to his fathers murderer is a glass eye left on the scene of the crime, suggesting that his fathers murderer was one-eyed. Thus many of the villains Sanshiro fought during the course of the series were one-eyed or had one eye concealed with an eye-patch.

The opening theme was performed by Mitsuko Horie (her first) when she was just 12 years old.

Cast

References

External links 
 

1968 manga
1969 anime television series debuts
Fictional judoka
Fictional jujutsuka
Fuji TV original programming
Judo in anime and manga
Shogakukan manga
Shōnen manga
Shueisha manga
Shueisha franchises
Tatsunoko Production